The year 1984 was the 203rd year of the Rattanakosin Kingdom of Thailand. It was the 39th year in the reign of King Bhumibol Adulyadej (Rama IX), and is reckoned as year 2527 in the Buddhist Era.

Incumbents
King: Bhumibol Adulyadej 
Crown Prince: Vajiralongkorn
Prime Minister: Prem Tinsulanonda
Supreme Patriarch: Ariyavangsagatayana VII

Events

January

February

March

April

May

June

July

August

September

October

November

December

Births

Deaths

See also
 1984 in Thai television
 List of Thai films of 1984

References

External links

 
Years of the 20th century in Thailand
Thailand
Thailand
1980s in Thailand